Al Shamiya is an area of Kuwait City. 

Suburbs of Kuwait City